Jhalokati, also spelled Jhalokathi, is a district in southern Bangladesh. It is located in the Barisal Division and covers an area of 758.06 km2 It is bounded by Barisal district to the north and east, Barguna district and the Bishkhali river in the south, Lohagara Upazila and Pirojpur district to the west. Annual average temperatures: maximum 33.3 °C, minimum 12.1 °C; annual rainfall 2506 mm. The main rivers in this district are Bishkhali, Dhanshiri, Gabkhan, Sugandha, Jangalia, Bamanda and Bajitpur. "পেয়ারা আর শীতলপাটি, এই নিয়ে ঝালকাঠি" "(Jhalokathi, The land of tasty Guava and Shitolpati)" is the official moto of the district.

History 
The 2021 Bangladesh ferry fire occurred on the Sugandha River near the town.

Subdivisions
The district is administratively subdivided into 4 upazilas, these are:

Jhalokati Sadar Upazila
Kathalia Upazila
Nalchity Upazila
Rajapur Upazila

Administration 
Zilla Parishad Chairman/Administrator: Khan Saifullah Panir (খান সাইফুল্লাহ পনির) 

Deputy Commissioner (DC): Md. Johar Ali

Transportation
Roads & Highways:
Rural communications: Water transport is a major attraction in Jhalokati district. People can travel at a cheap cost by boats and various types of engine boats. Jhalokati is famous for beautiful rivers and canals like Barishal. Tourists can find it enjoyable to travel through boats.

Population

According to the 2011 Bangladesh census, the district had a population of 682,669, of which 329,147 were males and 353,522 females. Rural population was 570,666 (83.59%) while urban population was 112,003 (16.41%). The literacy rate is 66.68% for 7 years and above: 67.59% for males and 65.84% for females.

Religion 

A large majority of the district population is Muslim. It has 2475 mosques, 46 Hindu temples and five Buddhist pagodas. The percentage share of minority Hindus and Christians have seen a decline in absolute numbers since the 1981 census.

Media
Print media:
Prothom Alo (National)
Kaler kantho (National)
Samakal (National)
The Daily Star (National)

Telecommunications: 
BTCL
Bangla Link
Teletalk
Grameen Phone
Robi etc.

Satellite Television:
Akash dth.

Notable personalities
Maqsudullah, Islamic scholar and first Pir of Talgachhia
Nachiketa Chakraborty, famous Tollywood singer's family hails from Chechri Rampur village in Kathalia Upazila

See also
Districts of Bangladesh
Barisal Division
Abhaynil

Notes

References

 
Districts of Bangladesh